The Fleming Peaks are a small group of peaks  east-southeast of Bailey Ridge, on the north side of Boyd Glacier in the Ford Ranges of Marie Byrd Land, Antarctica. They were discovered and mapped by the United States Antarctic Service (1939–41), and were named by the Advisory Committee on Antarctic Names for Bernard Fleming, an assistant to the scientific staff on the Byrd Antarctic Expedition (1933–35).

References 

Mountains of Marie Byrd Land